Richard Loree Anderson (April 20, 1915 – February 19, 2003) was an American econometrician. He was a Professor of Statistics at North Carolina State University from 1941 to 1966. In 1967, he took up chairmanship of the newly established Department of Statistics at the University of Kentucky, a position he held until 1979. In 1951 he was elected as a Fellow of the American Statistical Association. While a professor at the University of Kentucky, he consulted with a number of drug companies on clinical trials. Even before, he had been consulting several computer programming companies including IMSL, BMDP, and SAS.

References

External links 
 
 Material at NCSU Library

1915 births
2003 deaths
People from St. Joseph County, Indiana
American statisticians
DePauw University alumni
Iowa State University alumni
North Carolina State University faculty
University of Kentucky faculty
Fellows of the American Statistical Association